Quantock Row refers to two row houses in Savannah, Georgia:

Quantock Row (Chatham Square), built in 1852
Quantock Row (Jones Street), built in 1854